The line of sight, also known as visual axis or sightline (also sight line), is an imaginary line between a viewer/observer/spectator's eye(s) and a subject of interest, or their relative direction. The subject may be any definable object taken note of or to be taken note of by the observer, at any distance more than least distance of distinct vision. In optics, refraction of a ray due to use of lenses can cause distortion. Shadows, patterns and movement can also influence line of sight interpretation (as in optical illusions).

The term "line" typically presumes that the light by which the observed object is seen travels as a straight ray, which is sometimes not the case as light can take a curved/angulated path when reflected from a mirror, refracted by a lens or density changes in the traversed media, or deflected by a gravitational field. Fields of study feature specific targets, such as vessels in navigation, marker flags or natural features in surveying, celestial objects in astronomy, and so on. To have optimal observational outcome, it is preferable to have a completely unobstructed sightline.

Applications

 Sightline (architecture)
 Line-of-sight range
 Line-of-sight (missile), the straight line between the missile and the target
 Line-of-sight propagation, electro-magnetic waves travelling in a straight line
 Non-line-of-sight propagation
 Line-of-sight fire, shooting directly at a visible target on a relatively flat trajectory
 Line-of-sight velocity, an object's speed straight towards or away from an observer
 Line-of-sight double star, one in which two stars are only coincidentally close together as seen from Earth
 Beyond visual line of sight

References

Geometry